CNN International Asia Pacific is the Asia-Pacific edition of the CNN International pay-TV cable network.  The feed originates from Hong Kong and Indonesia.

CNN International Asia Pacific officially launched on 1 August 1989.

From 1997 until 2005, this edition included exclusive programmes to the Asia-Pacific region such as Asia This Day, CNN This Morning (Asian edition), News Biz Today and Asia Tonight.  Since mid-2003, News Biz Today and Asia Tonight (which were eventually renamed into CNN Today and World News Asia respectively) were simulcast on the other editions of CNN International. Other programming differences included airing reruns of key programmes like Amanpour and varying showtimes of weekend magazine programmes when live news is shown elsewhere to allow Asia-Pacific audiences to watch them at a similar time slots to their counterparts elsewhere.

In addition, from 1995 to 2004, to differentiate the Asia Pacific feed from the other feeds, the network logo on the lower-right hand of the screen had a static globe with the Asian continent facing the audiences.

Today, the differences between the Asia-Pacific feed and the other feeds are minimal and are now limited to advertising, show promos, and weather updates.

Conversion to 16:9 and HD 
In mid-2013, CNNI Asia-Pacific introduced a 16:9 HD version of its feed on selected pay-TV operators.  It was at this time that all Hong Kong-based shows have started airing using a 16:9 format.  The SD version is still available but it is further downscaled to 4:3 letterbox on some providers.

Mainland China 
CNN has reported that their broadcast agreement in mainland China includes an arrangement that their signal must pass through a Chinese-controlled satellite. In this way, Chinese authorities have been able to black out CNN segments at will.

Programs
CNN Newsroom
News Stream
International Desk with Robyn Curnow
CNN Today
i Report for CNN
CNNGo
New Year's Eve Live
Business Traveller
World Sport
Quest Means Business
Connect the World with Becky Anderson
Hala Gorani Tonight
Amanpour
TalkAsia
Inside Africa
Inside the Middle East
Marketplace Middle East
Marketplace Europe
African Start Up
African Voices
Eco Solutions
Living Golf 
Open Court
MainSail
Winning Post
CNN Presents
CNN Freedom Project
Cold War
Anderson Cooper 360°
CNN Tonight with Don Lemon
Vital Signs with Dr. Sanjay Gupta
State of the Union
Fareed Zakaria GPS
Erin Burnett Outfront
Smerconish

CNN
Television channels and stations established in 1989
Television stations in Hong Kong
Turner International Australia
Warner Bros. Discovery Asia-Pacific